Eskice can refer to:

 Eskice, Çorum
 Eskice, Ilgaz
 Eskice, Kozluk